A denim skirt, sometimes referred to as a 'jean skirt' or 'jeans skirt', is a skirt made of denim, the same material as blue jeans. Denim skirts come in a variety of styles and lengths to suit different populations and occasions. For example, full-length denim skirts are commonly worn by women whose religious beliefs prohibit them from wearing trousers, including Orthodox Jews, some Muslims, Mennonites, and Pentecostals, among others. Shorter skirts made of denim are commonly worn by teenagers and young adults.
 
Some are modeled after an exact style of jeans, with a front fly, belt loops, and back pockets. Others are constructed more like other types of skirts, with a column of front button, closures on the side or back, or elastic waists. Like jeans, denim skirts vary in shades of blue, ranging from very pale to very dark, or occasionally in other colors.  During winter and colder months, denim skirts are often worn with leggings or tights.

History
In the 1960s, hippies first came up with the idea of recycling old denim jeans into long denim skirts, by opening the inseams, and inserting pieces of triangular denim (or any other fabric) in the front and, unless a tall slit in back is preferred, also in the back of the opened-up trousers.

Denim skirts were first introduced in mainstream fashion lines in the 1970s, and since then have grown in popularity. Circa-1983, denim miniskirts—with a pencil skirt silhouette—became a popular teenage fashion. They were initially in darker blues, but eventually pinstripes (light blue on darker blue, red on black) and acid wash. The trend faded in the late 1980s when knit miniskirts were dominant.

Denim miniskirts reemerged in the latter portion of the 1990s. Marnie Bjornson, a well-known figure in the Reykjavik style scene, is credited with reinvigorating the denim skirt in 1996. The same year, Pamela Anderson wore a light washed denim skirt in a promotional photo shoot for the film Barb Wire. The denim miniskirt of the early 21st century was shorter than its 1980s counterpart.

Styles of denim skirt

The classic style of a denim skirt resembles a common pair of jeans, with a front fly, a fitted waist, belt loops, and pockets. There have been a large number of other styles constructed over time to resemble other types of skirts.

Several types of skirts are more common in denim than in other fabrics—they typically include skirts with a variety of panels, going beyond the four panels most common with other fabrics.  These include chevron, diagonal, diamond, horizontal, multiple vertical panels, and combinations of the above.  Denim skirts not made from pants are often designed as though they were made from pants, i.e. with front and back triangular denim panels.

To tone down the rough and somewhat masculine look of the denim fabric, denim skirts are sometimes designed with alternating cloth panels, which can be diagonal, triangular, vertical, or there can be cloth panel trim at the bottom of the skirt. Also, to make the skirt look more feminine, denim skirts are (more often than skirts made from other fabrics), trimmed with fringes, lace, leather fringes, or decorated with embroidery, patchwork, rhinestones, writing, or even painting. Prints are quite rare on denim skirts. Deviating from the front fly and button closure is common though, with back or side zippers or a column of front buttons (on a "fake" fly) being common.

One style denim skirts share with jeans is the ripped or destroyed look, which is more common with short denim skirts than with long ones.

Another style shared with jeans and jeans cutoffs, but maybe even more popular in denim skirts, is the rough hem.  This is achieved by not hemming the skirt (or undoing or cutting off the existing hem) and washing the skirt by machine several times. The resulting edge of the skirt will have a frayed or unraveling look, popular with teenagers and young women.  The longer unraveled threads are usually cut off for an even fuzzy look, but some teenagers leave them hanging on their shorter skirts.

References

External links
 1984 video game flyer showing a woman wearing a denim skirt

Jeans by type
1970s fashion
1980s fashion
1990s fashion
2000s fashion
2010s fashion
2020s fashion
Skirts